Dende may refer to:
Dende (Dragon Ball), a character in Dragon Ball media
 Dende, a musical instrument used by children in Botswana, similar to the kalumbu in Zimbabwe
 Dende, a place in Nyanga Province, Gabon

People with the surname
 Cornelian Dende (1915-1996), Polish-American priest

See also
 Dende oil or palm oil